The Violin Maker of Mittenwald is a 1950 West German drama film directed by Rudolf Schündler and starring Willy Rösner, Paul Richter and Franziska Kinz.

It is a heimatfilm, based on Ludwig Ganghofer's play of the same name. It was shot at the Bavaria Studios in Munich. Location filming took place in the Austrian Tyrol, Cremona in Italy and Mittenwald in Bavaria, known as a historic centre of violin manufacturing.

Cast
 Willy Rösner as Benedikt Oberbucher
 Paul Richter as Vitus Brandner
 Franziska Kinz as Posthalterin
 Erika von Thellmann as Kuni Schlederer
 Ingeborg Cornelius as Afra Schlederer
 Erika Remberg as Veronika
 Elise Aulinger as Barbara
 Gustl Gstettenbaur as Ludwig
 Heinz-Leo Fischer as Serventa
 Sepp Nigg as Klarinettensteffl
 Thea Aichbichler as Theres
 Rolf Pinegger as Jägerfranzl
 Franz Fröhlich as Posthalter
 Minna Spaeth as Agathe
 Hans Pössenbacher as Loisl
 Karl Finkenzeller as Italienischer Reisender
 Ruth Killer as Freundin von Serventa
 Bertl Schultes as Bürgermeister
 Karl Theodor Langen
 Loni Schultes
 Ruth Kappelsberger
 Georg Bauer
 Melanie Webelhorst

References

Bibliography 
 Goble, Alan. The Complete Index to Literary Sources in Film. Walter de Gruyter, 1999.

External links 
 

1950 films
West German films
German drama films
1950 drama films
1950s German-language films
Films directed by Rudolf Schündler
Films shot at Bavaria Studios
Bavaria Film films
Films set in the Alps
German films based on plays
Films based on works by Ludwig Ganghofer
Remakes of German films
Films about violins and violinists
German black-and-white films
1950s German films